This is an incomplete list of comics based on television programs. Often a television program becomes successful, popular or attains cult status and the franchise produces spin-offs that often include comics.

A number of companies specialise in licensed properties, including Gold Key Comics, Dark Horse Comics, Titan Books and Dynamite Entertainment. With the bigger series the license can often pass to a number of companies over the history of the title.

0—9

24

77 Sunset Strip

Tales of the 77th Bengal Lancers

A
Adam-12 (Gold Key Comics, December 1973—February 1976)
The Addams Family (Gold Key Comics, October 1974—April 1975)
Adventure Time:
Adventure Time (Boom! Studios, February 2012—April 2018)
Adventure Time/Regular Show (Boom! Studios, August 2017—January 2018)
Adventure Time: Beginning of the End (Boom! Studios, May—July 2018)
Adventure Time Season 11 (Boom! Studios, October 2018—May 2019)
Adventures in Paradise (Four Color (Volume 2) #1301, Dell Comics, February-April 1962)
The Adventures of Puss in Boots (Titan Comics, May—August 2016)
The Adventures of Rocky and Bullwinkle and Friends:
Rocky and His Friends (Four Color (Volume 2) #1128, #1153, #1166, #1275 and #1311, Dell Comics, August-October 1960, December 1960-February 1961, March-May 1961, December 1961-February 1962 and March-July 1962)
Bullwinkle and Rocky (1962) (Four Color (Volume 2) #1270, Dell Comics, March-May 1962)
Rocky and His Fiendish Friends (Gold Key Comics, October 1962—September 1963)
Fractured Fairy Tales (Gold Key Comics, October 1962)
Bullwinkle (Dell Comics/Gold Key Comics, July—November 1962)
Bullwinkle and Rocky (1970) (Charlton Comics, July 1970—July 1971)
Bullwinkle and Rocky (1972) (Whitman Publishing, April 1972—February 1980)
Bullwinkle and Rocky 3-D (Blackthorne 3-D Series #18, Blackthorne Publishing, March 1987)
Bullwinkle and Rocky (1987) (Marvel Comics/Star Comics, November 1987—March 1989)
Rocky and Bullwinkle (2014) (IDW Publishing, March—June 2014)
The Rocky and Bullwinkle Show (American Mythology, 2017—September 2018)
Rocky and Bullwinkle — As Seen on TV (American Mythology, 2019—March 2020)
Adventures of the Galaxy Rangers (Marvel UK, June—September 1988)
Adventures of the Mask (Dark Horse Comics, January—December 1996)
The A-Team (Marvel Comics, March—May 1984)
Angel Cop
Æon Flux
Aggretsuko
ALF (Marvel Comics, March 1988—February 1992)
Alfred J. Kwak
Alien Nation Television Special: The Lost Episode (Malibu Comics, 1992)
Angel
Animaniacs (DC Comics, December 1994; March 1995—April 2000)
Alvin (based on The Alvin Show, Dell Comics, October-December 1962—October 1973)
Alvin and the Chipmunks (Harvey Comics, July 1992—May 1994)
The Amazing Chan and the Chan Clan (Gold Key Comics, May 1973—February 1974)
The Andy Griffith Show (Four Color (Volume 2) #1252 and #1341, Dell Comics, January-March 1962 and April-June 1962)
Archie Meets Glee
Archie Meets Riverdale (Archie Comics, July 2022)
Astro Boy:
Astro Boy (Gold Key Comics, 1965)
The Original Astro Boy (Now Comics, September 1987—June 1989)
The Atom Ant/Secret Squirrel Show:
Atom Ant (Gold Key Comics, January 1966)
Secret Squirrel (Gold Key Comics, October 1966)
Atom Ant and Secret Squirrel (Hanna-Barbera Presents #1, Archie Comics, November 1995)
Avatar: The Last Airbender
The Avengers:
John Steed Emma Peel (Gold Key Comics, November 1968)
Steed and Mrs. Peel (1990) (Eclipse Comics, December 1990—April 1992)
Steed and Mrs. Peel (2012) (Boom! Studios, January—June 2012; August 2012—July 2013)
Steed and Mrs Peel: We're Needed (Boom! Studios, July—September 2014)
Batman '66 Meets Steed and Mrs Peel (DC Comics/Boom! Studios, September 2016—February 2017)

B
 Babylon 5 #1—11 (DC Comics, January—December 1995)
 Bachelor Father, Four Color (Volume 2) #1332 (Dell Comics, April-June 1962); Regular series #2 (Dell Comics, September-November 1962)
 Back to the Future, Special (Harvey Comics, 1991); Regular series #1—4 (Harvey Comics, November 1991—June 1992); Limited series #1—3 (Harvey Comics, October 1992—January 1993)
The Banana Splits #1—8 (Gold Key Comics, January 1970—October 1971)
 Bat Masterson, Four Color (Volume 2) #1013 (Dell Comics, August-October 1959); Regular series #2—9 (Dell Comics, February-April 1960—November 1961-January 1962)
 Batman (based on the 1966 TV series):
 Batman '66 #1—30 (DC Comics, September 2013—February 2016)
 Batman '66 Meets the Green Hornet #1—6 (DC Comics/Dynamite Entertainment, August 2014—January 2015)
 Batman '66: The Lost Episode #1 (DC Comics, January 2015)
 Batman '66 Meets the Man from U.N.C.L.E. #1—6 (DC Comics/Dynamite Entertainment, February—July 2016)
 Batman '66 Meets Steed and Mrs Peel #1—6 (DC Comics/Boom! Studios, September 2016—February 2017)
 Batman '66 Meets Wonder Woman '77 #1—6 (DC Comics, March—August 2017)
 Batman '66 Meets the Legion of Super Heroes #1 (DC Comics, September 2017)
 Archie Meets Batman '66 #1—6 (DC Comics/Archie Comics, September 2018—March 2019)
Batman: The Brave and the Bold, Series 1 #1—22 (DC Comics, March 2009—December 2010); The All New! #1—16 (DC Comics, January 2011—April 2012)
 The Batman Strikes! #1—50 (DC Comics, November 2004—December 2008)
 Battle of the Planets:
 Battle of the Planets (1979) #1—10 (Gold Key Comics/Whitman Publishing, June 1979—December 1980)
 Battle of the Planets (2002) #1—12 + 1/2 (Top Cow Productions/Image Comics, August 2002—September 2003)
 Battle of the Planets/Witchblade #1 (Top Cow Productions/Image Comics, February 2003)
 Battle of the Planets/ThunderCats #1 (Top Cow Productions/Image Comics, May 2003)
 Battle of the Planets: Mark #1 (Top Cow Productions/Image Comics, May 2003)
 Battle of the Planets: Jason #1 (Top Cow Productions/Image Comics, July 2003)
 Battle of the Planets Manga #1—3 (Top Cow Productions, November 2003—January 2004)
 Battle of the Planets: Princess #1—6 (Top Cow Productions/Image Comics, November 2004—May 2005)
 Battlestar Galactica:
 Battlestar Galactica, adaptation of the pilot film, Marvel Comics Super Special #8 (Marvel Comics, January 1979)
 Battlestar Galactica (1979) #1—23, based on the 1978 series (Marvel Comics, March 1979—January 1981)
 Battlestar Galactica: Apollo's Journey #1—4 (Maximum Press, April 1995)
 Battlestar Galactica (1995) #1—4 (Maximum Press, July—November 1995)
 Battlestar Galactica: The Enemy Within #1—3 (Maximum Press, November 1995—February 1996)
 Battlestar Galactica: Starbuck #1—3 (Maximum Press, December 1995—March 1996)
 Battlestar Galactica: Journey's End #1—4 (Maximum Press, August—November 1996)
 Battlestar Galactica: Special Edition #1 (Maximum Press, January 1997)
 Battlestar Galactica (1997) #1—5 (Realm Press, December 1997—June 1998)
 Battlestar Galactica: Search for Sanctuary (Realm Press, September 1998)
 Battlestar Galactica: Search for Sanctuary Special (Realm Press, 1999) 
 Battlestar Galactica Special Edition: Centurion Prime (Realm Press, March 1999)
 Battlestar Galactica: Season III #1—3 (Realm Press, June—September 1999)
 Galactica: The New Millennium #1 (Realm Press, September 1999)
 Battlestar Galactica: Eve of Destruction Prelude (Realm Press, December 1999)
 Battlestar Galactica: Gallery Special (Realm Press, April 2000)
 Battlestar Galactica (volume 1) #0—12, based on the 2004 series (Dynamite Entertainment, June 2006—July 2007)
 Battlestar Galactica Classic (volume 1) #1—5 (Dynamite Entertainment, October 2006—March 2007)
 Battlestar Galactica: Cylon Apocalypse #1—4 (Dynamite Entertainment, March—June 2007)
 Battlestar Galactica: Zarek #1—4 (Dynamite Entertainment, December 2006—April 2007)
 Battlestar Galactica: Season Zero #1—12 (Dynamite Entertainment, August 2007—August 2008)
 Battlestar Galactica: Pegasus (Dynamite Entertainment, November 2007)
 Battlestar Galactica: Origins #1—11 (Dynamite Entertainment, December 2007—October 2008)
 Battlestar Galactica: Ghosts #1—4 (Dynamite Entertainment, October 2008—January 2009)
 Battlestar Galactica: Cylon War #1—4 (Dynamite Entertainment, January—April 2009)
 Battlestar Galactica: The Final Five #1—4 (Dynamite Entertainment, April—July 2009)
 Galactica 1980 #1—4, based on the 1978 series' sequel series (Dynamite Entertainment, September 2009—January 2010)
 Battlestar Galactica (volume 2) #1—12, based on the 1978 series (Dynamite Entertainment, May 2013—June 2014)
 Battlestar Galactica: Starbuck #1—4 (Dynamite Entertainment, 2013—2014)
 Li'l Battlestar Galactica (Dynamite Entertainment, January 2014)
 Battlestar Galactica Annual #1 (Dynamite Entertainment, April 2014)
 Battlestar Galactica: Six #1—5 (Dynamite Entertainment, April 2014—May 2015)
 Steampunk Battlestar Galactica 1880 #1—4 (Dynamite Entertainment, August—November 2014)
 Battlestar Galactica: Death of Apollo #1—6 (Dynamite Entertainment, December 2014—May 2015)
 Battlestar Galactica: Gods and Monsters #1—5 (Dynamite Entertainment, 2016—2017)
 Battlestar Galactica (volume 3) #1—5, based on the 1978 series (Dynamite Entertainment, August—December 2016)
 Battlestar Galactica vs. Battlestar Galactica #1—6 (Dynamite Entertainment, January—June 2018)
 Battlestar Galactica Classic (volume 2) #0—5 (Dynamite Entertainment, October 2018—May 2019)
 Battlestar Galactica: Twilight Command #1—5 (Dynamite Entertainment, February—June 2019)
 Beany and Cecil:
 Bob Clampett's Beany and Cecil, based on the original series Time for Beany, Four Color (Volume 2) #368, #414, #448, #477, #530, #570, #635, Dell Comics, January 1952, August 1952, January 1953, June 1953, January 1954, July 1954, June 1955)
 Beany and Cecil #1–5 (Dell Comics, July 1962-September 1963)
 Beauty and the Beast #1—6 (Innovation Publishing, May—October 1993) 
 Beavis and Butt-Head #1—28 (Marvel Comics, March 1994—June 1996)
 Ben Casey #1–10 (Dell Comics, July 1962–August 1965)
 The Beverly Hillbillies #1–21 (Dell Comics, April 1963–October 1971)
 Beetlejuice, Series 1 #1 (Harvey Comics, October 1991); Beetlejuice in the Netherworld #1 (Harvey Comics, November 1991); Horror-Day Special! #1 (Harvey Comics, February 1992); Crimebusters on the Haunt #1–3 (Harvey Comics, September—November 1992)
 Beware the Batman #1—6 (DC Comics, December 2013—May 2014)
 Bewitched #1–14 (Dell Comics, April 1965-October 1969)
 The Big O
 The Big Valley #1–6 (Dell Comics, June 1966–October 1969)
 Biker Mice from Mars #1–3 (Marvel Comics, November 1993—January 1994)
 The Bionic Woman:
 The Bionic Woman (1977) #1—5 (Charlton Comics, October 1977—June 1978)
 The Bionic Woman (2012) #1—10 (Dynamite Entertainment, April 2012—July 2013)
 The Bionic Woman Season Four #1—4 (Dynamite Entertainment, September—December 2014)
 Blade Runner: Black Lotus #1—4 (Titan Comics, September—December 2022)
 Bob's Burgers, Limited series #1—5 (Dynamite Entertainment, August—December 2014); Ongoing series  #1—16 (Dynamite Entertainment, June 2015—October 2016)
 Bonanza, Four Color (Season 2) #1110, #1221, #1283 (Dell Comics, June-August 1960, September-November 1961, February-April 1962); Series 1 #207—210 (Dell Comics, May-July 1962—August-October 1962); Series 2 #1—37 (Gold Key Comics, August 1962—August 1970)
 Boots and Saddles, Four Color (Season 2) #919, #1029, #1116 (Dell Comics, July 1958, September-November 1959, August-October 1960)
 The Brady Bunch #1–2 (Dell Comics, February–May 1970)
 Brave Eagle, Four Color (Volume 2) #673, #705, #770, #816, #879, #929 (Dell Comics, January 1956, June 1956, February 1957, July 1957, February 1958, August 1958)
 BraveStarr in 3-D, Blackthorne 3-D Series #27—40 (Blackthorne Publishing, 1987—April 1988)
 Broken Arrow, Four Color (Volume 2) #855, #947 (Dell Comics, November 1957, November 1958)
 The Buccaneers, Four Color (Volume 2) #800 (Dell Comics, May 1957)
 Buck Rogers in the 25th Century #2—16 (Gold Key Comics, July 1979—May 1982)
Buckskin, Four Color (Volume 2) #1011, #1107 (Dell Comics, July-September 1959, June-August 1960)
Buffalo Bill, Jr., Four Color (Volume 2) #742, #766, #798, #828, #856 (Dell Comics, September 1956, February 1957, May 1957, August 1957, November 1957); Regular series #7–13 (Dell Comics, April 1958–October 1959)
Buffy the Vampire Slayer
 Burke's Law #1–3 (Dell Comics, May 1964—March 1965)

C
Calvin and the Colonel (Four Color (Volume 2) #1354, Dell Comics, April-June 1962; Regular series #2, Dell Comics, July-September 1962)
Camp Candy (Marvel Comics, May—October 1990)
Captain Kangaroo (Four Color (Volume 2) #721, #780 and #872, Dell Comics, August 1956, 1957 and January 1958)
Captain N: The Game Master (Valiant Comics, 1990)
Captain Nice (Gold Key Comics, November 1967)
Captain Planet and the Planeteers (Marvel Comics, October 1991—October 1992)
Car 54, Where Are You? (Four Color (Volume 2) #1257, Dell Comics, March-May 1962)
Care Bears (Marvel Comics/Star Comics, November 1985—January 1989)
Cartoon Network:
Cartoon Cartoons (DC Comics, March 2001—October 2004)
Cartoon Network: Action Pack! (DC Comics, July 2006—August 2010)
Cartoon Network: Block Party (DC Comics, November 2004—December 2008)
Cartoon Network Presents (DC Comics, August 1997—August 1999)
Cartoon Network Starring (DC Comics, September 1999—February 2001)
Cartoon Network: Super Secret Crisis War! (IDW Publishing, June—November 2014)
Casey Jones (Four Color (Volume 2) #915, Dell Comics, 1958)
Castle (Marvel Comics, February—July 2013)
Charlie's Angels:
Charlie's Angels: The Devil You Know (Dynamite Entertainment, June—October 2018)
Charlie's Angels vs. the Bionic Woman (Dynamite Entertainment, July—October 2019)
Charmed:
Charmed: Season 9 (Zenescope Entertainment, June 2010—October 2012)
Charmed: Season 10 (Zenescope Entertainment, October 2014—September 2016)
Checkmate (Gold Key Comics, October—December 1962)
Cheyenne (Four Color (Volume 2) #734, #772 and #803, Dell Comics, January 1956, February 1957 and May 1957)
Chip 'n Dale Rescue Rangers (Disney Comics, June 1990—December 1991; Boom! Studios, September 2010—May 2011)
Chuck (WildStorm, August 2008—January 2009)
Chuck Norris: Karate Kommandos (Marvel Comics/Star Comics, January—July 1987)
Circus Boy (Four Color (Volume 2) #759, #785 and #813 Dell Comics, 1957, April 1957 and 1957)
Cobra Kai
The Colossal Show (Gold Key Comics, 1969)
Colt .45 (Four Color (Volume 2) #924, #1004 and #1058, Dell Comics, August 1958, June-August 1959 and November 1959-January 1960)
The Coneheads (Marvel Comics, June—September 1994)
COPS (DC Comics, August 1988—August 1989)
Countdown
Count Duckula
Cowboy Bebop
Cowboy Bebop (2021)
Cowboy Bebop: Shooting Star
Cowboy in Africa (Gold Key Comics, March 1968)
Crusader Rabbit (Four Color (Volume 2) #735, #805, Dell Comics, 1956, 1957)
CSI

D
Dad's Army
Danger Man:
Secret Agent (Gold Key Comics, November 1966—January 1968) 
Daniel Boone (Gold Key Comics, January 1965—April 1969)
The Danny Thomas Show (Four Color (Volume 2) #1180 and #1249, Dell Comics, April-June 1961 and November 1961-January 1962)
The Dark Crystal: Age of Resistance (Boom! Studios/Archaia Entertainment, September 2019—October 2020)
Dark Shadows (Gold Key Comics, March 1968—February 1976)
Darkwing Duck (Disney Comics, November 1991; Boom! Studios, June 2010—October 2011; Joe Books Inc., April 2016—February 2017)
DC Animated Universe:
The Batman Adventures (based on Batman: The Animated Series, DC Comics, October 1992—October 1995)
The Batman and Robin Adventures (DC Comics, November 1995—December 1997)
Superman Adventures (based on Superman: The Animated Series, DC Comics, November 1996—April 2002)
The Batman Adventures: The Lost Years (DC Comics, January—May 1998)
Batman: Gotham Adventures (based on The New Batman Adventures, DC Comics, June 1998—July 2002)
Batman Beyond (DC Comics, March—August 1999; November 1999—October 2001)
Justice League Adventures (DC Comics, 2002—2004)
Batman: The Adventures Continue (DC Comics, August 2020—March 2021)
Batman: The Adventures Continue Season Two (DC Comics, August 2021—February 2022)
DC Meets Hanna-Barbera (DC Comics, May 2017—December 2018):
Adam Strange/Future Quest Special #1 (DC Comics, May 2017)
Booster Gold/The Flintstones Special #1 (DC Comics, May 2017)
Green Lantern/Space Ghost Special #1 (DC Comics, May 2017)
Suicide Squad/Banana Splits Special #1  (DC Comics, May 2017)
The Flash/Speed Buggy Special #1 (DC Comics, July 2018)
Super Sons/Dynomutt and the Blue Falcon Special #1 (DC Comics, July 2018)
Black Lightning/Hong Kong Phooey Special #1 (DC Comics, July 2018)
Aquaman/Jabberjaw Special #1 (DC Comics, July 2018)
Deathstroke/Yogi Bear Special #1 (DC Comics, December 2018)
Green Lantern/Huckleberry Hound Special #1 (DC Comics, December 2018)
Nightwing/Magilla Gorilla Special #1 (DC Comics, December 2018)
Superman/Top Cat Special #1 (DC Comics, December 2018)
Defenders of the Earth (Marvel Comics/Star Comics, January—July 1987)
The Deputy (Four Color (Volume 2) #1077 and #1130, Dell Comics, February-April 1960 and September-November 1960)
Deputy Dawg (Four Color (Volume 2) #1238 and #1299, Dell Comics, October-December 1961 and April-June 1962)
Dexter:
Dexter (Marvel Comics, September 2013—January 2014)
Dexter Down Under (Marvel Comics, April-August 2014)
Dexter's Laboratory:
Dexter's Laboratory (1997) (Cartoon Network Presents #1, DC Comics, August 1997)
Dexter's Laboratory (1999) (DC Comics, September 1999—April 2003)
Dexter's Laboratory: Knights of the Periodic Table (DC Comics, 2003)
"Training Wheel Day" (Cartoon Cartoons #17, DC Comics, June 2003)
"Lockout!" (Cartoon Cartoons #18, DC Comics, July 2003)
"Mr. Fun Guy" (Cartoon Cartoons #19, DC Comics, August 2003)
"Unsightly Mole" (Cartoon Cartoons #21, DC Comics, October 2003)
"Sunken Leisure" (Cartoon Cartoons #23, DC Comics, December 2003)
"Dancing Fool" (Cartoon Cartoons #25, DC Comics, February 2004)
"Super Cereal" (Cartoon Cartoons #27, DC Comics, April 2004)
"The Amazing Race" (Cartoon Cartoons #28, DC Comics, May 2004)
"Farmer in the Lab" (Cartoon Cartoons #29, DC Comics, June 2004)
"Do or Dye" (Cartoon Cartoons #30, DC Comics, July 2004)
"Fizzy Whiz" (Cartoon Cartoons #32, DC Comics, September 2004)
"Dex-O-Vision" (Cartoon Cartoons #33, DC Comics, October 2004)
Dexter's Laboratory (2014) (IDW Publishing, April—July 2014)
Digimon: Digital Monsters (Dark Horse Comics, May—November 2000)
Dinosaucers (Lion Forge Comics, August 2018—January 2019)
Dinosaurs (Hollywood Comics, 1992—1993)
Disenchantment: Untold Tales
The Disney Afternoon:
The Disney Afternoon (Marvel Comics, November 1994—August 1995)
Disney Afternoon Giant (IDW Publishing, October 2018—December 2019)
Disney anthology television series:
Davy Crockett
Davy Crockett, Indian Fighter (Four Color (Volume 2) #631, Dell Comics, May 1954)
Davy Crockett at the Alamo (Four Color (Volume 2) #639, Dell Comics, July 1955)
Davy Crockett in The Great Keelboat Race (Four Color (Volume 2) #664, Dell Comics, 1955)
Davy Crockett and the River Pirates (Four Color (Volume 2) #671, Dell Comics, 1955)
Man in Space (Four Color (Volume 2) #716, Dell Comics, 1956)
Andy Burnett (based on The Saga of Andy Burnett, Four Color (Volume 2) #865, Dell Comics, December 1957) 
Mars and Beyond (Four Color (Volume 2) #866, Dell Comics, December 1957)
Man in Space: Satellites (Four Color (Volume 2) #954, Dell Comics, 1959)
Texas John Slaughter (Four Color (Volume 2) #997 and #1181, Dell Comics, July 1959 and April 1961)
The Nine Lives of Elfego Baca (Four Color (Volume 2) #997, Dell Comics, July 1959)
The Swamp Fox (Four Color (Volume 2) #1179, Dell Comics, May 1961)
The Horsemasters (Four Color (Volume 2) #1260, Dell Comics, December 1961-February 1962)
Hans Brinker (Four Color (Volume 2) #1273, Dell Comics, March-May 1962)
Escapade in Florence (Gold Key Comics, January 1963)
Mooncussers (Walt Disney's World of Adventure #1, Gold Key Comics, April 1963)
Johnny Shiloh (Walt Disney's World of Adventure #2, Gold Key Comics, July 1963)
The Horse Without a Head (Gold Key Comics, January 1964)
The Scarecrow of Romney Marsh (Gold Key Comics, April 1964—October 1965)
Gallegher, Boy Reporter (Gold Key Comics, May 1965)
The Legend of Young Dick Turpin (Gold Key Comics, May 1966)
Diver Dan (Four Color (Volume 2) #1254, Dell Comics, February-April 1962)
Doctor Who:
 Doctor Who Polystyle comic strip (TV Comic (1964–1971, 1973–1979) and Countdown (1971–1973), Polystyle Publications Ltd, November 14, 1964—May 11, 1979)
 The Daleks (TV Century 21, City Magazines, January 23, 1965—January 14,1967)
 Doctor Who Magazine (Panini Comics, October 17, 1979—present)
 Doctor Who Adventures (Panini Comics, April 5, 2006—present)
Dollhouse: Epitaphs (Dark Horse Comics, March—November 2011)
Dr. Kildare (Four Color #1337, Dell Comics, April-June 1962; Regular series #2—9, Dell Comics, July-September 1962—April-June 1965)
Dr. Zitbag's Transylvania Pet Shop (Buster, Fleetway/Egmont UK, September 1994—November 1996)
Duckman:
Duckman (Topps Comics, November 1994—May 1995)
Duckman: The Mob Frog Saga (Topps Comics, November 1994—February 1995)
DuckTales:
DuckTales (based on the 1987 TV series) (Gladstone Publishing, October 1988—May 1990; Disney Comics, June 1990—November 1991; Boom! Studios/Kaboom!, May—October 2011)
DuckTales (based on the 2017 TV series) (IDW Publishing, July 2017—April 2019)
DuckTales: Faires and Scares (IDW Publishing, December 2019—February 2020)
DuckTales: Silence and Science (IDW Publishing, August—October 2019)
Dynomutt, Dog Wonder:
Dynomutt (Marvel Comics, November 1977—September 1978)
"Cat on a Hot Tin Pooch" (Cartoon Network Presents #21, DC Comics, May 1999)

E
El Chavo
El Chapulín Colorado
Eureka
Expanse

F
Falling Skies:
Falling Skies (Dark Horse Comics, June 2011)
Falling Skies: The Battle of Fitchburg (Dark Horse Comics, October 2012)
Family Affair (Gold Key Comics, January—October 1970)
Fantastic Voyage (Gold Key Comics, August—December 1969)
Farscape:
Farscape: War Torn (WildStorm, April—May 2002)
Farscape (limited series) (Boom! Studios, November 2008—February 2009)
Farscape (ongoing series) (Boom! Studios, November 2009—October 2011)
Farscape: D'Argo's Lament (Boom! Studios, April—July 2009)
Farscape: Gone and Back (Boom! Studios, July—October 2009)
Farscape: D'Argo's Trial (Boom! Studios, August—November 2009)
Farscape: D'Argo's Quest (Boom! Studios, December 2009—March 2010)
Farscape: Scorpius (Boom! Studios, April—November 2010)
Fat Albert and the Cosby Kids (Gold Key Comics, March 1974—February 1979)
Filmation's Ghostbusters (First Comics, February—June 1987)
Filmation's Isis
Firefly:
Firefly (2018) (Boom! Studios, November 2018—January 2022)
All New Firefly (Boom! Studios, February—November 2022)
The Flintstones:
The Flintstone Kids (Marvel Comics/Star Comics, August 1987—April 1989)
The Flintstones and the Jetsons (DC Comics, August 1997—May 1999)
Flipper (Gold Key Comics, April 1964—November 1967)
Foofur (Marvel Comics/Star Comics , August 1987—June 1988)
Fraggle Rock:
Fraggle Rock (1985) (Marvel Comics/Star Comics, April 1985—September 1996)
Fraggle Rock: Monsters from Outer Space (Boom! Studios/Archaia Entertainment, October 2011)
Fraggle Rock: Journey to the Everspring (Boom! Studios/Archaia Entertainment, October 2014—January 2015)
Frankenstein Jr. and The Impossibles (Gold Key Comics, January 1967; Hanna-Barbera Presents #8, Archie Comics, November 1996)
Fringe:
Fringe (WildStorm, October 2008—August 2009)
Fringe: Tales from the Fringe (WildStorm, August 2010—January 2011)
Frontier Doctor (Four Color (Volume 2) #877, Dell Comics, 1957)
F-Troop (Dell Comics, August 1966—August 1967)
The Funky Phantom (Gold Key Comics, March 1972—March 1975)
Fury (Four Color (Volume 2) #781, #1031, #1080, #1133, #1172, #1218, Dell Comics, August 1957, September-November 1959, February-April 1960, August-October 1960, March-May 1961, September-November 1961)
Futurama Comics (Bongo Comics, November 2000—July 2018)

G
 The Gallant Men #1 (Gold Key Comics, October 1963)
 Gargoyles:
 Gargoyles (1995) #1–11 (Marvel Comics, February—December 1995)
 Gargoyles (2006) #1–5 (Slave Labor Graphics, June 2006—August 2009)
 Gen:Lock #1–6 (DC Comics, January—June 2020)
 George of the Jungle — with Tom Slick and Super Chicken #1—2 (Gold Key Comics, February—October 1969)
 Garrison's Gorillas #1–5 (Dell Comics, January 1968–October 1969)
 Gentle Ben #1–5 (Dell Comics, February 1968–October 1969)
 The Get Along Gang #1–6 (Marvel Comics/Star Comics, May 1985—March 1986)
 Get Smart #1–8 (Dell Comics, June 1966—September 1967)
 Ghost Whisperer:
 Ghost Whisperer: The Haunted #1–5 (IDW Publishing, March—July 2008)
 Ghost Whisperer: The Muse #1–4 (IDW Publishing, December 2008—March 2009)
 Gidget #1–2 (Dell Comics, April–December 1966)
 The Girl from U.N.C.L.E. #1—5 (Gold Key Comics, January—October 1966)
 Gobots:
 Gobots Magazine #1–4 (Telepictures Publishing, January—September 1986)
 Go-Bots #1—5 (IDW Publishing, November 2018—March 2019)
 Gomer Pyle, U.S.M.C. #1—3 (Gold Key Comics, July 1966—October 1967) 
 The Governor and J.J. #1—3 (Gold Key Comics, February—August 1970)
 The Gray Ghost, Four Color (Volume 2) #911, #1000 (Dell Comics, June 1958, June-August 1959)
 Gravity Falls: Lost Legends (based on Gravity Falls, Disney Press, August 2018)
 The Green Hornet:
 The Green Hornet (1967) #1—3 (Gold Key Comics, February—August 1967)
 Batman '66 Meets the Green Hornet #1–6 (DC Comics/Dynamite Entertainment, August 2014—January 2015)
 The Green Hornet '66 Meets the Spirit #1–5 (Dynamite Entertainment, 2017) 
 Gumby:
 Gumby 3-D #1–7 (Blackthorne Publishing, October 1986—January 1988)
 Gumby's Summer Fun Special #1 (Comico, July 1987)
 Gumby's Winter Fun Special #1 (Comico, December 1988)
 Gumby (2006) #1–3 (Wildcard Ink, July 2006—July 2007)
 Gumby FCDB 2007, 2008 (Wildcard Ink, May 2007, May 2008)
 Gumby's Gang #1 (Wildcard Ink, July 2010)
 Gumby (2017) #1–3 (Papercutz, July—September 2017)
 Gunsmoke #6–27 (Dell Comics, January 1958–July 1961)

H
The Hair Bear Bunch (Gold Key Comics, February 1972—February 1974)
Hanna-Barbera:
Hanna-Barbera All-Stars (Archie Comics, October 1995—April 1996)
Hanna-Barbera Band-Wagon (Gold Key Comics, October 1962—April 1963)
Hanna-Barbera Giant Size (Harvey Comics, October 1992—October 1993)
Hanna-Barbera Hi-Adventure Heroes (Gold Key Comics, May—August 1969)
Hanna-Barbera Parade (Charlton Comics, September 1971—December 1972)
Hanna-Barbera TV Stars (Marvel Comics, August 1978—February 1979)
Hanna-Barbera Presents (Archie Comics, November 1995—November 1996)
Hanna-Barbera Spotlight (Marvel Comics, September 1978)
Hanna-Barbera Super TV Heroes (Archie Comics, April 1968—September 1969)
Hanna-Barbera Yogi Bear D.A.R.E. (Hanna-Barbera, 1989)
Hanna-Barbera Beyond (DC Comics, May 2016—April 2019):
Future Quest (DC Comics, May 2016—May 2017)
Scooby Apocalypse (DC Comics, May 2016—April 2019)
The Flintstones 	(DC Comics, June 2016—June 2017)
Wacky Raceland (DC Comics, June—November 2016)
Future Quest Presents (DC Comics, August 2017—July 2018)
Dastardly and Muttley (September—February 2018)
The Jetsons (DC Comics, November 2017—April 2018)
Exit, Stage Left!: The Snagglepuss Chronicles (DC Comics, January—June 2018)
Happy Days (Gold Key Comics, March 1979—January 1980)
Harlem Globetrotters (Gold Key Comics, April 1972—January 1975)
The Hathaways (Four Color (Volume 2) #1298, Dell Comics, March-June 1962)
Have Gun, Will Travel (Four Color (Volume 2) #931, #983 and #1044, Dell Comics, 1958, 1959 and 	October-December 1959)
Hawaiian Eye (Gold Key Comics, July 1963)
Hawkeye and the Last of the Mohicans (Four Color (Volume 2) #884, Dell Comics, March 1958)
The Head: A Legend Is Born
Hector Heathcote (Gold Key Comics, March 1964)
He-Man and the Masters of the Universe:
Masters of the Universe (Marvel Comics/Star Comics, May 1986—May 1988)
Hercules: The Legendary Journeys (Topps Comics, June—October 1996)
High Adventure (Four Color (Volume 2) #949, #1001, Dell Comics, November 1958, August-October 1959)
The High Chaparral (Gold Key Comics, 1968)
Honey West (Gold Key Comics, September 1966)
Hong Kong Phooey (Charlton Comics, May 1975—November 1976)
Hotel de Paree — Sundance (Four Color (Volume 2) #1126, Dell Comics, August-October 1960)
Hotel Transylvania: The Series: My Little Monster-Sitter (Papercutz, June 2019) 
Howdy Doody (Dell Comics, January 1950—September 1956)
H.R. Pufnstuf (Gold Key Comics, October 1970—July 1972)
The Huckleberry Hound Show:
Huckleberry Hound (Four Color (Volume 2) #990 and #1050, Dell Comics, May-July 1959 and October-December 1959)
Huckleberry Hound Winter Fun (Four Color (Volume 2) #1054, Dell Comics, December 1959)
Yogi Bear (1959) (Four Color (Volume 2) #1067, Dell Comics, December 1959-February 1960)
Yogi Bear Goes to College (Four Color (Volume 2) #1104, Dell Comics, June-August 1960)
Huckleberry Hound for President (Four Color (Volume 2) #1141, Dell Comics, October 1960)
Pixie and Dixie and Mr. Jinks (Four Color (Volume 2) #1196, #1264, Dell Comics, July-September 1961, December 1961-February 1962)
Huck and Yogi Winter Sports (Four Color (Volume 2) #1310, Dell Comics, March 1962)
Husbands: The Comic

I

I Dream of Jeannie

I Love Lucy

I Spy

I'm Dickens, He's Fenster

Inhumanoids

Invader Zim

The Invaders

Iron Horse

It's About Time

J
Jackie Chan Adventures
James Bond Jr. (Marvel Comics, January—December 1992)
Jem
Jericho
Jesse James is a Dead Man
The Jetsons (Gold Key Comics, January 1963—September 1970; Charlton Comics, October 1970—December 1973; Harvey Comics, September 1992—October 1993)
Jim Bowie (Four Color (Volume 2) #893 and #993, Dell Comics, 1958 and May 1959)
Johnny Ringo (Four Color (Volume 2) #1142, Dell Comics, November 1960-January 1961)
Johnny Test: The Once and Future Johnny (Viper Comics, September 2011)
Jonny Quest

K

Kid 'n Play

King Leonardo and His Short Subjects

Kissyfur

Kolchak: The Night Stalker

The Krofft Supershow

L
Lady Penelope
Laff-a-Lympics (Marvel Comics, March 1978—March 1979)
Lancelot Link, Secret Chimp (Gold Key Comics, May 1971—February 1973)
Land of the Giants (Gold Key Comics, November 1968—September 1969)
Laramie (Four Color (Volume 2) #1125, Dell Comics, August-October 1960) 
Lawman (Four Color (Volume 2) #970, #1035, Dell Comics, December 1958, 1959)
Leave It to Beaver
The Legend of Jesse James (Gold Key Comics, February 1966)
The Legend of Korra
Legion of Super-Heroes in the 31st Century (DC Comics, June 2007—January 2009)
Lidsville (Gold Key Comics, October 1972—October 1973)
The Life of Riley (Four Color (Volume 2) #917, Dell Comics, July 1958)
Linus the Lionhearted (Gold Key Comics, September 1965)
Lippy the Lion and Hardy Har Har (Gold Key Comics, March 1963)
Little Dracula (Harvey Comics, January—May 1992)
The Little Mermaid (Marvel Comics, September 1994—August 1995)
Lost in Space:
Lost in Space (Innovation Publishing, August 1991—January 1994)
Lost in Space: The Lost Adventures (American Gothic Press, March—November 2016)
The Loud House (Papercutz, May 2017—August 2022)
The Lucy Show (Gold Key Comics, June 1963—June 1964)

M
Mackenzie's Raiders (Four Color (Volume 2) #1093, Dell Comics, June-August 1960)
The Magilla Gorilla Show:
Magilla Gorilla (Gold Key Comics, May 1964—December 1968)
Mushmouse and Punkin Puss (Gold Key Comics, September 1965)
Man from Atlantis (Marvel Comics, February—August 1978) 
The Man from U.N.C.L.E.:
The Man from U.N.C.L.E. (1965) (Gold Key Comics, May 1965—April 1969)
The Man from U.N.C.L.E.: The Birds of Prey Affair (Millennium Publications, March—September 1993) 
Margie (Four Color #1307, Dell Comics, March-May 1962; Regular series #2, Dell Comics, July-September 1962)
Married...with Children:
Married... with Children (1990) (NOW Comics, June 1990—February 1991)
Married... with Children (1991) (NOW Comics, September 1991—April 1992)
The Marvel Action Hour:
Marvel Action Hour Preview (Marvel Comics, 1994)
Marvel Action Hour: Iron Man (Marvel Comics, November 1994—June 1995)
Marvel Action Hour: Fantastic Four (Marvel Comics, November 1994—June 1995)
Marvel Adventures (Based around the 1990s Marvel animated TV series, Marvel Comics, April 1997—September 1998)
M.A.S.K. (DC Comics, December 1985—March 1986; February—October 1987)
Masked Rider (Marvel Comics, April 1996)
Maverick (Four Color (Volume 2) #892, #930, #945, #962, #980 and #1005, Dell Comics, April 1958, 1958, October 1958, 1959, February 1959 and July-September 1959)
Men into Space (Four Color (Volume 2) #1083, Dell Comics, March 1960)
The Mickey Mouse Club:
Corky and White Shadow (Four Color (Volume 2) #707, Dell Comics, May 1956)
The Hardy Boys (Four Color (Volume 2) #760, #808, #830, #887 and #964, Dell Comics, December 1956, June 1957, August 1957, January 1958 and January 1959)
Spin and Marty (Four Color (Volume 2) #714, #767, #808, #1026 and #1082, Dell Comics, 1956, 1957, June 1957, September-November 1959 and March-May 1960 ; Regular series, Dell Comics, May 1958—August 1959)
Spin and Marty and Annette (Four Color (Volume 2) #826, Dell Comics, September 1957)
Clint and Mac (Four Color (Volume 2) #889, Dell Comics, March 1958)
Annette (Four Color (Volume 2) #905, Dell Comics, May 1958)
The Mighty Hercules (Gold Key Comics, July—November 1963)
The Mighty Heroes (Dell Comics, March—July 1967; Spotlight Comics, 1987; Marvel Comics/Paramount Comics, January 1998) 
Millennium (IDW Publishing, January—May 2015)
Milton the Monster and Fearless Fly (Gold Key Comics, May 1966)
Mission: Impossible (Dell Comics, May 1967—October 1969)
Mister Ed the Talking Horse (Four Color (Volume 2) #1295, Dell Comics, March-May 1962; Regular series #1—6, Gold Key Comics, November 1962—February 1964)
¡Mucha Lucha! (DC Comics, June—August 2003)
The Munsters (Gold Key Comics, January 1965—February 1958)
Muppet Babies (Marvel Comics/Star Comics, May 1985—July 1989; Harvey Comics, June 1992—August 1994)
The Muppet Show
My Favorite Martian (Gold Key Comics, January 1964—October 1966)
My Little Pony
My Little Pony: Friendship is Magic

N
Neon Genesis Evangelion
The New Adventures of Charlie Chan (DC Comics, 1958)
The New Adventures of Huck Finn (Gold Key Comics, December 1968)
The Nurses (Gold Key Comics, April—October 1963)

O
Oggy and the Cockroaches
Once Upon a Time:
Once Upon a Time: Shadow of the Queen (Marvel Comics, September 2013)
Once Upon a Time: Out of the Past (Marvel Comics, April 2015)
Orphan Black
The Orville
Our Miss Brooks (Four Color (Volume 2) #751, Dell Comics, 1956)
Over the Garden Wall

P
The Partridge Family (Charlton Comics, March 1971—November 1973)
Pebbles and Bamm-Bamm (Charlton Comics, January 1972—December 1976)
Penny Dreadful (Titan Comics, May—November 2016; May 2017—December 2018)
Perry Mason (Dell Comics, June—December 1964)
Peter Gunn (Four Color (Volume 2) #1087, Dell Comics, April-June 1960)
Peter Potamus (Gold Key Comics, January 1965)
Phantom 2040 (Marvel Comics, May—August 1995)
Phineas and Ferb (Phineas and Ferb Magazine #12—21, Disney Publishing Worldwide, October 2012—November 2013)
Pinky and the Brain:
Pinky and the Brain Christmas Special (DC Comics, January 1996)
Pinky and the Brain (DC Comics, July 1996—November 1998)
The Pirates of Dark Water (Marvel Comics, November 1991—July 1992)
Police Academy (Marvel Comics, October 1989—February 1990)
Potsworth & Co. (The Beezer and Topper #87—153, DC Thomson, May 1992—August 1993; The Dandy #2701—, DC Thomson, August 1993—1994)
Power Rangers:
Power Rangers Zeo (Image Comics, August 1996)
Power Rangers Turbo vs. Beetleborgs Metallix (Saban Powerhouse #2, Acclaim Comics/Valiant Comics, October 1997)
Justice League/Mighty Morphin Power Rangers (DC Comics/Boom! Studios, March—November 2017)
Mighty Morphin Power Rangers/Teenage Mutant Ninja Turtles (IDW Publishing/Boom! Studios, March—July 2022)
Godzilla vs. Mighty Morphin Power Rangers (IDW Publishing/Boom! Studios, December 2019—June 2020)
The Powerpuff Girls:
The Powerpuff Girls (1999) (Cartoon Network Starring #1, DC Comics, September 1999)
"Black and Blue Period" (Cartoon Network Starring #5, DC Comics, January 2000)
The Powerpuff Girls (based on the 1998 TV series) (DC Comics, May 2000—March 2006)
The Powerpuff Girls (2013) (IDW Publishing, September 2013—June 2014) 
The Powerpuff Girls (based on the 2016 TV series) (IDW Publishing, July—December 2016)
The Powerpuff Girls: Super Smash-Up! (IDW Publishing, January—May 2015)
The Powerpuff Girls: The Bureau of Bad (IDW Publishing, November 2017—January 2018)
The Powerpuff Girls: The Time Tie (IDW Publishing, May—July 2017)
The Prisoner:
The Prisoner: Shattered Visage (DC Comics, December 1988—February 1989)
The Prisoner (Titan Comics, April—September 2018)
ProStars (NBC Saturday Morning Comics #1, Harvey Comics, September 1991)

Q

Quantum Leap

The Quick Draw McGraw Show

R
Rage (Red Cape Comics, March 2002)
Rainbow Brite (Dynamite Entertainment, October 2018—March 2019)
The Real Ghostbusters (Marvel UK/NOW Comics, August 1988—December 1990; November 1991—February 1992)
The Real McCoys (Four Color (Volume 2) #1071, #1134, Dell Comics, January-March 1960, September-November 1960)
The Rebel (Four Color (Volume 2) #1076, Dell Comics, February-April 1960)  
Regular Show:
Regular Show (Boom! Studios, April 2013—October 2016)
Regular Show: Skips (Boom! Studios, November 2013—April 2014)
Adventure Time/Regular Show (Boom! Studios, August 2017—January 2018)
Regular Show: 25 Years Later (Boom! Studios, June—November 2018)
The Ren & Stimpy Show (Marvel Comics, December 1992—July 1996)
Restless Gun (Four Color (Volume 2) #934, #986, #1045, #1089 and #1146, Dell Comics, September 1958, November 1959-January 1960, April-June 1959, April 1960 and November 1960-January 1961)
Rick and Morty
The Rifleman (Four Color (Volume 2) #1009, Dell Comics, July-September 1959; Regular series #2—20, Dell Comics/Gold Key Comics, January-March 1960—October 1964)
Robin of Sherwood
Robotech
Robotix (Marvel Comics, February 1986)
Rocko's Modern Life:
Rocko's Modern Life (1994) (Marvel Comics, June—December 1994)
Rocko's Modern Life (2017) (Boom! Studios, December 2017—September 2018)
Rocko's Modern Afterlife (Boom! Studios, April—July 2019)
The Roman Holidays (Gold Key Comics, November 1972—August 1973)
Rootie Kazootie (Four Color (Volume 2) #415, #459 and #502, Dell Comics, August 1952 and 1953; Regular series #4—6, Dell Comics, June—December 1954)
The Ruff and Reddy Show:
Ruff and Reddy — In Deepest Africa..."Scary Safari" (Four Color (Volume 2) #937, Dell Comics, September 1958)
Ruff and Reddy (Four Color (Volume 2) #981 and #1038, Dell Comics, April-June 1959 and October-December 1959; Regular series #4—12, Dell Comics, January-March 1960—January-March 1962)
The Ruff and Reddy Show (DC Comics, December 2017—May 2018)
Rugrats:
Rugrats (1996) (Marvel Comics, May 1996)
Rugrats Comic Adventures (Nickelodeon, November 1997—August 1998; October 1998—July 1999; November 1999—July 1990)
Rugrats (2017) (Boom! Studios, October 2017—May 2018)
Rugrats: R is for Reptar Special (Boom! Studios, April 2018)
Rugrats: C Is For Chanukah Special (Boom! Studios, November 2018)
Run, Buddy, Run! (Gold Key Comics, June 1967)
RWBY

S
Saber Rider and the Star Sheriffs (Lion Forge Comics, March—June 2016)
Samurai Jack
Saved by the Bell (Harvey Comics, May 1992—May 1993)
Scooby-Doo
Sea Hunt (Four Color (Volume 2) #928, #994, #1041, Dell Comics, August 1958, May 1959, October-December 1959)
Sectaurs: Warriors of Symbion (Marvel Comics, June 1985—September 1986)
The Shield: Spotlight (IDW Publishing, January—May 2004)
Shotgun Slade (Four Color (Volume 2) #1111, Dell Comics, July-September 1960)
SilverHawks (Marvel Comics/Star Comics, August 1987—August 1988)
The Simpsons:
Simpsons Comics (Bongo Comics, November 1993—October 2018)
The Simpsons' Treehouse of Horror (Bongo Comics, September 1995—September 2017)
The Simpsons Futurama Crossover Crisis (Bongo Comics, August 2002—March 2005)
Sir Lancelot and Brian (based on The Adventures of Sir Lancelot, Four Color (Volume 2) #775, Dell Comics, 1957)
Sítio do Picapau Amarelo
The Six Million Dollar Man:
The Six Million Dollar Man (Charlton Comics, June 1976—June 1978)
The Six Million Dollar Man Season 6 (Dynamite Entertainment, March—September 2014)
The Six Million Dollar Man: Fall of Man (Dynamite Entertainment, July—November 2016)
G.I. Joe vs. The Six Million Dollar Man (Dynamite Entertainment, February—May 2018)
The Six Million Dollar Man in Japan (Dynamite Entertainment, March—July 2019)
Skeleton Warriors (Marvel Comics, April—July 1995) 
Sliders (Acclaim Comics/Armada, June 1996—March 1997)
Slimer! (Now Comics, May 1989—November 1990)
Smallville (DC Comics, May 2003—January 2005)
The Smurfs (Marvel Comics, December 1982—February 1983)
Snorks
Sonic X
Sons of Anarchy
Space: 1999 (Charlton Comics, November 1975—November 1976)
Space Battleship Yamato
Space: Above and Beyond:
 Space: Above and Beyond (Topps Comics, January—March 1996)
 Space: Above and Beyond — The Gauntlet (Topps Comics, May—June 1996)
Space Cats (NBC Saturday Morning Comics #1, Harvey Comics, September 1991)
Space Ghost:
 Space Ghost (1966) (Gold Key Comics, December 1966)
 "The Plague of Giants" (Hanna-Barbera Super TV Heroes #3, Gold Key Comics, October 1968)
 "The Sun Master" (Hanna-Barbera Super TV Heroes #6, Gold Key Comics, July 1969)
 "The Mutant Planet" (Hanna-Barbera Super TV Heroes #7, Gold Key Comics, September 1969)
 Space Ghost (1987) (Comico, December 1987)
 Cartoon Network Presents: Space Ghost (Archie Comics, March 1997)
 Space Ghost (2005) (DC Comics, January—June 2005)
Space Ghost Coast to Coast (Cartoon Network Presents #2, DC Comics, September 1997; Cartoon Network Starring #4, 9, 12, 15 and 18, DC Comics, December 1999, May, August and November 2000 and February 2001)
Speed Buggy (Charlton Comics, May 1975—November 1976)
Speed Racer (NOW Comics, August 1987—November 1990)
Spider-Man (1994 TV series):
Spider-Man Adventures (Marvel Comics, December 1994—February 1996)
The Adventures of Spider-Man (Marvel Comics, April 1996—March 1997)
Spider-Man and His Amazing Friends (Marvel Comics, December 1981)
Spider-Man Unlimited (Marvel Comics, December 1999–April 2000)
SpongeBob Comics
Star Blazers (West Cape Comics, 1983; Comico, April 1987—July 1987; May—September 1989; Argo Press, March 1995—May 1997)
Star Trek:
 Star Trek (1967) (Gold Key Comics, 1967—1979)
 Star Trek (1980) (Marvel Comics, 1980–1982)
 Star Trek (1984) (DC Comics, 1984–1988; 1989–1996)
 Star Trek: The Next Generation  (DC Comics, 1988; 1989–1996)
 Star Trek: Deep Space Nine (Malibu Comics, August 1993—January 1996; Marvel Comics/Paramount Comics, November 1996—March 1998)
 Star Trek: Deep Space Nine/The Next Generation (Malibu Comics, October—November 1994)
 Star Trek: The Next Generation/Deep Space Nine (DC Comics, December 1994)
 Star Trek: Voyager (Marvel Comics/Paramount Comics, November 1996—March 1998)
 Star Trek/X-Men (Marvel Comics/Paramount Comics, December 1996) 
 Star Trek: Starfleet Academy (Marvel Comics/Paramount Comics, December 1996—June 1998)
 Star Trek: Early Voyages (Marvel Comics/Paramount Comics, February 1997—June 1998)
 Star Trek: Telepathy War (Marvel Comics/Paramount Comics, November 1997)
 Star Trek: The Next Generation/X-Men (Marvel Comics/Paramount Comics, May 1998)
 Star Trek: The Manga (Tokyopop, September 2006—April 2009)
 Star Trek (2007) (IDW Publishing, January 2007—present)
 Star Trek/Legion of Super-Heroes (DC Comics/IDW Publishing, October 2011—March 2012) 
 Star Trek: The Next Generation/Doctor Who: Assimilation² (IDW Publishing, May—December 2012)
 Star Trek/Planet of the Apes: The Primate Directive (IDW Publishing/Boom! Studios, December 2014—April 2015)
 Star Trek/Green Lantern (DC Comics/IDW Publishing, July—December 2015; December 2016—May 2017)
 Star Trek vs. Transformers (IDW Publishing, September 2018—January 2019)
Star Wars:
 Star Wars: Ewoks (Marvel Comics/Star Comics, May 1985—July 1987)
 Star Wars: Droids (Marvel Comics/Star Comics, April 1986—June 1987)
 Star Wars: Clone Wars – Adventures (Dark Horse Comics, July 2003—December 2007)
 Star Wars: The Clone Wars (Dark Horse Comics, September 2008—January 2010)  
 Star Wars Adventures: The Clone Wars (IDW Publishing, April—September 2020) 
Stargate
Steve Donovan, Western Marshal (Four Color (Volume 2) #675, #768 and #880, Dell Comics, 1956, 1957 and 1958)
Steve Zodiac and the Fireball XL5 (Gold Key Comics, December 1963)
Steven Universe
The Storyteller
Stranger Things
Strawberry Shortcake's Berry Bitty Adventures
Street Sharks (Archie Comics, January—March 1996; May—August 1996)
Stretch Armstrong and the Flex Fighters (IDW Publishing, January—March 2018)
Stunt Dawgs (Harvey Comics, March 1993)
Sugarfoot (Four Color (Volume 2) #907, #992, #1059, #1098, #1147 and #1209, Dell Comics, 1958, May-July 1959, November 1959-January 1960, May-July 1960, November 1960-January 1961 and October-December 1961)
Super Friends:
Super Friends (Limited Collectors' Edition #C-41, DC Comics, December 1975—January 1976)
The Super Friends (DC Comics, November 1976—August 1981)
Aquateers Meet the Super Friends (DC Comics, 1979) 
Super Hero Squad (Marvel Comics, November 2009—February 2010; March 2010—February 2011)
Superboy: The Comic Book (based on the Superboy TV series, DC Comics, February 1990—February 1982)
Supercar (Gold Key Comics, November 1962—August 1963)
Supernatural:
 Supernatural: Origins (DC Comics/WildStorm, July—December 2007)
 Supernatural: Rising Son (DC Comics/WildStorm, June—November 2008)
 Supernatural: Beginning's End (DC Comics/WildStorm, December 2011—May 2012)
 Supernatural: Caledonia (DC Comics, March—August 2010)

T
Tales of the Texas Rangers:
 Tales of the Texas Rangers (Four Color (Volume 2) #396, Dell Comics, May 1952)
 Jace Pearson of the Texas Rangers (Four Color (Volume 2) #648, Dell Comics, 1955)
 Jace Pearson's Tales of the Texas Rangers (Four Color (Volume 2) #961 and #1021, Dell Comics, 1959 and August 1959)
Tales of the Wizard of Oz (Four Color (Volume 2) #1308, Dell Comics, March-May 1962)
Tales of Wells Fargo (Four Color (Volume 2) #1023, #1075, #1113, February 1959, August-October 1959, February-April 1960, July-September 1960)
TaleSpin (Disney Comics, June—December 1991)
Target: The Corruptors! #1306 (Four Color (Volume 2), Dell Comics, March-May 1962)
Teen Titans Go! (2004) (based on Teen Titans, DC Comics, January 2004—July 2008)
Teen Titans Go! (2014) (DC Comics, February 2014—November 2019)
Teen Wolf (Top Cow Productions/Image Comics, September—November 2011)
Teenage Mutant Ninja Turtles (1987):
 Teenage Mutant Ninja Turtles Adventures (Archie Comics, August 1988—October 1995)
 Teenage Mutant Ninja Turtles Meet Archie (Archie Comics, March 1991)
 Teenage Mutant Ninja Turtles Meet the Conservation Corps (Archie Comics, 1992)
Teenage Mutant Ninja Turtles (2003) (based on the 2003 TV series, Dreamwave Productions, June—December 2003)
Teenage Mutant Ninja Turtles (2012):
 Teenage Mutant Ninja Turtles New Animated Adventures (IDW Publishing, 2013—2015)
 Teenage Mutant Ninja Turtles: Amazing Adventures (IDW Publishing, 2015—2016)
 Teenage Mutant Ninja Turtles: Amazing Adventures — Carmelo Anthony Special (IDW Publishing, 2016)
 Teenage Mutant Ninja Turtles: Amazing Adventures — Robotanimals! (IDW Publishing, 2017)
The Texan (Four Color (Volume 2) #1027 and #1096, Dell Comics, September-November 1959 and May-July 1960)
ThunderCats:
ThunderCats (1985) (Marvel Comics, December 1985—June 1988)
ThunderCats/Battle of the Planets (WildStorm, July 2003)
Superman/ThunderCats (WildStorm/DC Comics, January 2004)
He-Man/ThunderCats (October 2016—March 2017)
The Time Tunnel (Gold Key Comics, February—July 1967)
Tombstone Territory (Four Color (Volume 2) #1123, Dell Comics, August-October 1960)
Totally...M.I. High
Torchwood:
 Torchwood Magazine (Titan Magazines, January 24, 2008—December 16, 2010)
 Torchwood: The Official Comic (Titan Comics, September 2010—January 2011)
 Torchwood: World Without End (Titan Comics, August 2016—January 2017)
 Torchwood: Station Zero (Titan Comics, March—June 2017)
 Torchwood: The Culling (Titan Comics, November 2017—March 2018)
Toxic Crusaders (Marvel Comics, May—December 1992)
Trailer Park Boys:
Trailer Park Boys Get a F#C*!ng Comic Book (Devil's Due Publishing, July 2021)
Trailer Park Boys: Bagged & Boarded (Devil's Due Publishing, July 2021)
Trailer Park Boys: House of 1000 Conkys (Devil's Due Publishing, June 2022)
Trailer Park Boys in the Gutters (Devil's Due Publishing, September 2022)
Transformers: Aligned Universe:
Transformers: Prime (IDW Publishing, January 2011)
Transformers: Prime - Beast Hunters (IDW Publishing, May—December 2013)
Transformers: Robots in Disguise (IDW Publishing, July—December 2015)
Transformers: Animated (IDW Publishing, May—December 2008)
The Travels of Jaimie McPheeters (Gold Key Comics, December 1963)
Trollhunters: Tales of Arcadia:
Trollhunters: Tales of Arcadia: The Secret History of Trollkind (Dark Horse Comics, February 2018)
Trollhunters: Tales of Arcadia: The Felled (Dark Horse Comics, October 2018)
The Troubleshooters (Four Color (Volume 2) #1108, Dell Comics, June-August 1960)
True Blood (IDW Publishing, July—November 2010; May 2012—June 2013)
TV Century 21 (City Magazines/IPC Magazines, January 1965—September 1971)
TV Comic (News of the World/Beaverbrook/Polystyle Publications, November 1951—June 1984)
The Twilight Zone:
 The Twilight Zone (1962) (Gold Key Comics, November 1962—May 1982)
 The Twilight Zone (2015) (Dynamite Entertainment, December 2013—February 2015)
 The Twilight Zone Annual (Dynamite Entertainment, June 2014)
 The Twilight Zone: Lost Tales (Dynamite Entertainment, October 2014)
 The Twilight Zone: 1959 (Dynamite Entertainment, 2016)
 The Twilight Zone: Shadow & Substance (Dynamite Entertainment, January—April 2015)
 The Twilight Zone/The Shadow (Dynamite Entertainment, April—July 2016)

U

Ultimate Spider-Man

Underdog

V

V

Valley of the Dinosaurs

The Vampire Diaries

VeggieTales

The Virginian

Voltron

Voyage to the Bottom of the Sea

W
Wacky Races (Gold Key Comics, August 1969—May 1972)
Wagon Train (Four Color (Volume 2) #895, #971, #1019, Dell Comics, 1958, February 1959, August-October 1959)
Walt Disney's Zorro (Four Color (Volume 2) #882, #920, #933, #960, #976, #1003, #1037, Dell Comics, 1958, June 1958, September 1958, December 1958, March 1959, June 1959, September-November 1959)
Wanted: Dead or Alive! (Four Color (Volume 2) #1102, #1164, Dell Comics, May-July 1960, March-May 1961)
Warehouse 13 (Dynamite Entertainment, August 2011—April 2012)
Welcome Back, Kotter (DC Comics, November 1976—May 1978)
Werewolf:
Werewolf 3-D (Blackthrone Publishing, 1988)
Werewolf (Blackthrone Publishing, July 1988—May 1989)
Wheelie and the Chopper Bunch (Charlton Comics, May 1975—May 1976)
Where's Huddles? (Gold Key Comics, January—May 1971)
Whirlybirds (Four Color (Volume 2) #1124, Dell Comics, August-October 1960)
Wild West C.O.W.-Boys of Moo Mesa (Archie Comics, December 1992—February 1993; March—July 1993)
The Wild Wild West (Gold Key Comics, August 1966—October 1969; Millennium Publications, October 1990—January 1991)
Winky Dink (Four Color (Volume 2) #663, Dell Comics, 1955)
Winx Club (Rainbow Media, 2005; Viz, July 2012—September 2013)
Wish Kid (NBC Saturday Morning Comics #1, Harvey Comics, September 1991)
Wonder Woman:
Wonder Woman '77 Special (DC Comics, July 2015—November 2016)
Wonder Woman '77 Meets the Bionic Woman (DC Comics, December 2016—September 2017)
Batman '66 Meets Wonder Woman '77 (DC Comics, March—August 2017)
Wyatt Earp (based on The Life and Legend of Wyatt Earp, Four Color (Volume 2) #860, #890, #921, Dell Comics, 1957, 1958)

X

The X-Files

X-Men: The Animated Series

X-Men: Evolution

Xena: Warrior Princess

Y

The Yogi Bear Show

Yu-Gi-Oh!

Z

Z Nation

See also
Lists of comics based on media
List of comics based on films
List of comics based on fiction
List of comics based on Hasbro properties
List of comics based on unproduced film projects
List of comics based on video games
List of media based on comics
List of films based on comics
List of comic-based films directed by women
List of television programs based on comics
List of video games based on comics
Lists of media based on television programs
List of films based on television programs
Lists of television programs based on media
List of television programs based on comics
List of television programs based on video games

References

 
Television programs
Comics